The following is a list of DVDs of BBC sitcom Last of the Summer Wine.

Region 1
Last of the Summer Wine was originally released on DVD in the United States in 2003 from BFS Entertainment in a set which contains a set of select episodes from Series 1 and 2, and two specials. After which, BBC Video acquired the rights for home distribution of the series. They released every series (including the specials), besides the original pilot, the complete first and second series, which have yet to be released in the U.S.

Region 2

Note: A major flaw occurred when the set titled "Series 9 & 10" only contained the complete ninth series, while the three specials included on the set were released as the tenth series. The following set, "Series 11 & 12" contains the tenth and eleventh series. All subsequent sets have the series mistakenly released in this order.

Region 4

In Australia, the entire series have been release on DVD from 4 April 2004 to 19 July 2017 and was distributed by Roadshow.

Series 1–4 April 2004
Series 2–6 April 2006
Series 3 & 4–6 March 2008
Series 5 & 6–2 January 2009
Series 7 & 8–2 July 2009
Series 9 & 10–30 April 2010
Series 11 & 12–3 March 2011
Series 13 & 14–7 July 2011
Series 15 & 16–1 March 2012
Series 17 & 18–5 July 2012
Series 19 & 20–2 January 2013
Series 21 & 22–6 March 2013
Series 23 & 24–1 May 2013
Series 25 & 26–24 February 2015
Series 27 & 28–17 February 2016
Series 29 & 30–14 June 2017
Series 31 & 32–19 July 2017

UK VHS Releases
Between 1984 and 1999, numerous episodes from the 1970s and 1980s seasons of Last of the Summer Wine have been released in the UK on video cassettes by the BBC.

Between 2002 and 2004, Universal Pictures (UK) Ltd and Playback Video with exclusive under license from BBC Worldwide Ltd released two video boxsets containing the first four series of Last of the Summer Wine on two separate videos in each boxset.

References

Last of the Summer Wine
Last of the Summer Wine